Unione Sportiva Agropoli 1921 is an Italian football club based in Agropoli, Campania. Currently it plays in Italy's Serie D.

Colors and badge
The team's colors are white and light blue.

Honours
Eccellenza:
Winner (1): 2011–12

References

External links
  

Association football clubs established in 1921
Football clubs in Campania
Cilento
1921 establishments in Italy